The Kraft General Foods of Moscow (after the title sponsor of that year's WTA tour) was a women's tennis tournament played on indoor carpet courts at the Olympic Stadium in Moscow, Soviet Union, that was part of Tier V of the 1990 Kraft General Foods World Tour (1990 WTA Tour).

It was held from October 1 through 7, 1990, and was the second edition of the WTA tournament inaugurated under the title of Virginia Slims of Moscow in 1989 and later known as the St. Petersburg Open and the Moscow Ladies Open.

Finals

Singles 
 Leila Meskhi defeated  Elena Brioukhovets 6–4, 6–4
 It was Meskhi's 2nd WTA singles title of the year and the 3rd of her career.

Doubles 
 Gretchen Magers /  Robin White defeated  Elena Brioukhovets /  Eugenia Maniokova 6–2, 6–4
 It was Magers's 3rd WTA doubles title of the year and the 3rd of her career.

References

External links 
 WTA tournament edition details
 

Kraft General Foods of Moscow
Moscow Ladies Open
1990 in Russian women's sport
October 1990 sports events in Russia
1990 in Russian tennis